Geoff Eales (born 13 March 1951) is a Welsh jazz pianist, improviser and composer.

Music education
Eales was born in Aberbargoed, Wales. When he was eight years old, he learned 12-bar blues from his father, a pianist in a local dance band. In school he studied classical piano and French Horn, becoming a member of the Glamorgan Youth Orchestra and the National Youth Orchestra of Wales. He attended Cardiff University, receiving bachelor's, masters, and doctoral degrees. In 1980 he was awarded a Ph.D for his large scale orchestral work "An American Symphony" and a setting of Dylan Thomas' poem "In the Beginning" for tenor, French horn, and piano.

His thesis was entitled "Structure in the Symphonic Works of Aaron Copland".

Career
After leaving school, Eales played piano on a Greek cruise ship and traveled around the world. For a few months he lived in New Orleans where he worked with Major Holley, Jimmy McPartland, Buddy Tate, and Earl Warren. He moved to London in 1977 and became a member of the Joe Loss band, then spent four years as pianist for the BBC Big Band.

Eales has worked with Sir Andrew Lloyd Webber, Andy Williams, Dame Shirley Bassey, Jose Carreras, Kiri Te Kanawa, Jerry Goldsmith, Henry Mancini, Elmer Bernstein, Bob Farnon, Billy May, Adelaide Hall, Michael Ball and many others and has played on film soundtracks, records, TV shows and jingles.

He released his debut album, Mountains of Fire in 1999.

Discography

References

External links
 The Geoff Eales Trio, Jazz Piano Legends

1951 births
Living people
People from Aberbargoed
Welsh jazz pianists
Welsh jazz composers
21st-century pianists
Edition Records artists
Basho Records artists